Greg Turner (born 21 February 1963) is a New Zealand professional golfer.

Turner was born in Dunedin. He attended the University of Oklahoma in the United States but has spent most of his career on the PGA Tour of Australasia and the European Tour. He won four tournaments on the European Tour and achieved a career best ranking of 18th on the European Tour Order of Merit in 1997. He has represented New Zealand in international competitions many times and was one of Peter Thomson's two wild card selections (along with Frank Nobilo for the winning International Team in the 1998 Presidents Cup.

Since retiring from tournament golf, Turner has set up a golf course design and corporate hospitality business. He was also active in founding the Golf Tour of New Zealand, a series of tournaments in New Zealand for both amateur and professional golfers.

Turner's brothers are former national cricket captain Glenn Turner and award-winning poet Brian Turner. His sister-in-law, Sukhi Turner, is a former mayor of Dunedin.

At the age of 15, Turner's son Jack won the club championship of  the family's home club "The Hills".

Professional wins (12)

European Tour wins (4)

European Tour playoff record (1–2)

PGA Tour of Australasia wins (6)

Asia Golf Circuit wins (1)

Other wins (1)
1985 Fiji Open

Results in major championships

Note: Turner only played in The Open Championship and the PGA Championship.

CUT = missed the half-way cut
"T" indicates a tie for a place

Results in World Golf Championships

"T" = Tied

Team appearances
Amateur
Eisenhower Trophy (representing New Zealand): 1982, 1984

Professional
World Cup (representing New Zealand): 1985, 1987, 1988, 1989, 1990, 1991, 1992, 1993, 1994, 1998, 2000
Alfred Dunhill Cup (representing New Zealand): 1986, 1987, 1990, 1992, 1994, 1995, 1996, 1998, 1999, 2000
Presidents Cup (International Team): 1998 (winners)
Alfred Dunhill Challenge (representing Australasia): 1995

References

External links

New Zealand male golfers
Oklahoma Sooners men's golfers
PGA Tour of Australasia golfers
European Tour golfers
European Senior Tour golfers
PGA Tour Champions golfers
Sportspeople from Dunedin
1963 births
Living people